The 64th Bodil Awards  were held on 20 February 2011 at the Bremen Theater in Copenhagen, Denmark, honouring the best national and foreign films of 2010. Ditte Hansen and Louise Mieritz hosted the event. Submarino had most nominations, with five, but the ceremony did not have a clear winner. R won the award for Best Danish Film and its protagonist, Pilou Asbæk, won the award for Best Actor while Trine Dyrholm was named Best Actress (In a Better World). Kurt Ravn (Nothing's All Bad) and Patricia Schumann (Submarino) won the awards for Best Supporting Actor and Actress. Armadillo won both the awards for Best Documentary and Best Cinematographer. Tobias Lindholm received a Special Award for his contribution as a screenwriter both to R and Submarino. Henning Moritzen was given a Bodil Honorary Award for his contribution to Danish film.

Winners

Best Danish Film 
 R
 Clown
 In a Better World
 Submarino
 Truth About Men

Best Actor in a Leading Role 
Pilou Asbæk – R
 Jakob Cedergren – Submarino
 David Dencik – Brotherhood
 Mikael Persbrandt – In a Better World
 Peter Plauborg – Submarino

Best Actress in a Leading Role 
Trine Dyrholm – In a Better World
 Julie Brochorst Andersen – Hold Me Tight
 Ellen Hillingsø – The Experiment
 Bodil Jørgensen – Smukke mennesker
 Mille Hoffmeyer Lehfeldt – Nothing's All Bad

Best Actor in a Supporting Role 
Kurt Ravn – Nothing's All Bad
 Kim Bodnia – In a Better World
 Morten Holst – Brotherhood
 Gustav Fischer Kjærulff – Submarino
 Roland Møller – R

Best Actress in a Supporting Role 
Patricia Schumann Submarino
 Marijana Jankovic – Everything Will Be Fine
 Laura Skaarup Jensen – The Experiment
 Rosalinde Mynster – Truth About Men
 Paprika Steen – Everything Will Be Fine

Best American Film 
A Single Man (Inst: Tom Ford)
 Inception
 Somewhere
 The Kids Are All Right
 The Social Network

Best Non-American Film 
The White Ribbon 
 An Education
 Biutiful
 Fish Tank
 A Prophet

Best Cinematographer 
Lars Skree – Armadillo
Bedste dokumentarfilm
Armadillo

Bodil Special Award 
Tobias Lindholm for R and Submarino

Bodil Honorary Award 
Henning Moritzen

See also 

 2011 Robert Awards

References 

2010 film awards
Bodil Awards ceremonies
February 2011 events in Europe
2011 in Copenhagen